Menemerus zimbabwensis is a jumping spider species in the genus Menemerus that lives in Zimbabwe. The female was first described in 1999 and the male in 2007 by Wanda Wesołowska.

References

Spiders described in 1999
Endemic fauna of Zimbabwe
Salticidae
Spiders of Africa
Taxa named by Wanda Wesołowska